Parksville station is a former railway station in Parksville, British Columbia. It was a stop on Via Rail's Dayliner service, which ended in 2011.

Footnotes

External links 
Via Rail Station Description

Via Rail stations in British Columbia
Parksville, British Columbia
Railway stations closed in 2011
Disused railway stations in Canada